The president of the Senate of the Philippines ( or ) is the presiding officer and the highest-ranking official of the Senate of the Philippines, and third highest and most powerful official in the government of the Philippines. They are elected by the entire body to be their leader. The Senate president is second in the line of succession to the presidency, behind only the vice president and ahead of the speaker of the House of Representatives.

The current Senate president is Juan Miguel Zubiri. He was elected on July 25, 2022, the first day of the 19th Congress.

Election
The Senate president is elected by the majority of the members of the Senate from among themselves; Since there are 24 senators, 13 votes are needed to win the Senate presidency, including any vacant seats or senators not attending the session. Although Senate presidents are elected at the start of each Congress, there had been numerous instances of Senate coups in which a sitting Senate president is unseated in the middle of session. Term-sharing agreements among senators who are both eyeing the position of the Senate president also played a role in changing the leadership of the Senate, but in a smooth manner, the peaceful transition of power and this was done two times in 1999 and in 2006.

Unlike most Senate presidents that are the symbolic presiding officers of the upper house, the Senate president of the Philippines wields considerate power by influencing the legislative agenda and has the ability to vote not just in order to break ties, although the Senate president is traditionally the last senator to vote. A tied vote, therefore, means that the motion is lost, and that the Senate president cannot cast a tie-breaking vote since that would mean that the presiding officer would have had voted twice.

Powers and duties
According to the Rule 3 of the Rules of the Senate, the Senate president has the powers and duties to:

 To preside over the sessions of the Senate on the days and at the hours designated by it; to call the Senate to order and, if there is a quorum, to order the reading of the Journal of the preceding session and, after the Senate shall have acted upon it, to dispose of the matters appearing in the Order of Business in accordance with the Rules;
 To decide all points of order;
 To sign all measures, memorials, joint and concurrent resolutions; issue warrants, orders of arrest, subpoena and subpoena duces tecum;
 To see to it that all resolutions of the Senate are complied with;
 To have general control over the session hall, the antechambers, corridors and offices of the Senate;
 To maintain order in the session hall, the antechambers, corridors and in the offices of the Senate, and whenever there is disorder, to take appropriate measures to quell it;
 To designate an acting sergeant-at-arms, if the sergeant-at-arms resigns, is replaced or becomes incapacitated;
 To appoint the subordinate personnel of the Senate in conformity with the provisions of the General Appropriations Act;
 To dismiss any employee for cause, which dismissal in the case of permanent and classified employees shall be in conformity with the Civil Service Law; and
 To diminish or increase the number of authorized personnel by consolidating or separating positions or items whenever the General Appropriations Act so authorizes and the total amount of salaries or allocations does not exceed the amount earmarked therein.

The Senate president is also the ex officio chairman of the Commission on Appointments, a constitutional body within the Congress that has the sole power to confirm all appointments made by the president of the Philippines. Under Section 2 of Chapter 2 of the Rules of the Commission on Appointments, the powers and duties of the Senate president as its ex-officio chairman are as follows:
 to issue calls for the meetings of the commission;
 to preside at the meetings of the commission;
 to preserve order and decorum during the session and, for that purpose, to take such steps as may be convenient or as the commission may direct;
 to pass upon all questions of order, but from his decision, any member may appeal to the commission; and,
 to execute such decisions, orders, and resolutions as may have been approved by the commission.

And if other impeachable officers other than the president such as the ombudsman is on an impeachment trial, the Senate president is the presiding officer and shall be the last to vote on the judgment on such cases according to the Senate Rules of Procedure in Impeachment Trials the Senate adopted on March 23, 2011.

In the Senate, he supervises the committees and attended its hearings and meetings if necessary and such committee reports are being submitted to his/her office.

List of Senate presidents
The Senate was created on 1916 with the abolition of the Philippine Commission as the upper house with the Philippine Assembly as the lower house. The Senate and the House of Representatives comprised the Philippine Legislature (PL). Representation was by senatorial district; Manuel L. Quezon was elected senator from the now-defunct 5th legislative district.

All senators from 1941 onwards were elected at-large, with the whole Philippines as one constituency.

Timeline

Sources
List of Senators of the Philippines
Roll of Senate Presidents

References

 
Legislative speakers in the Philippines
Philippines
Philippines
Political office-holders in the Philippines